Richard Walter Zisk (born February 6, 1949) is an American former professional baseball outfielder and designated hitter. He played in Major League Baseball (MLB) for the Pittsburgh Pirates, Chicago White Sox, Texas Rangers and Seattle Mariners.

Career

Pittsburgh Pirates
Zisk was drafted by the Pittsburgh Pirates out of Seton Hall University in the third round of the 1967 Major League Baseball draft. He made his major league debut on September 8, 1971, replacing Roberto Clemente in right field in the eighth inning of Pittsburgh's 10–1 victory over the Chicago Cubs, and got a single in his first major league at-bat. Zisk also made seventeen appearances with the 1972 Pirates, however, he was not on either team's post-season roster.

In Zisk's rookie season, 1973, he batted .324 with ten home runs. On June 9, 1974, he hit for the cycle in a 14–1 victory over the San Francisco Giants at Candlestick Park. For the season, he led the Pirates with 100 runs batted in while also clubbing seventeen home runs. He made his only post-season appearances with the 1974 and 1975 Pirates. While batting an impressive .400 in the post-season, Zisk only scored one run and had no RBIs as the Pirates lost in five games to the Dodgers in the 1974 NLCS and were swept by the Reds in the 1975 NLCS.

Chicago White Sox

Zisk was acquired along with Silvio Martinez by the Chicago White Sox from the Pirates for Goose Gossage and Terry Forster at the Winter Meetings on December 10, 1976. His best season was in 1977, his lone year with the White Sox, when he hit 30 home runs and had 101 RBIs, both career highs, in addition to a .290 batting average. He started in left field for the American League in the 1977 All-Star game. He went two for three with a double and two RBIs.

Texas Rangers
Zisk became a free agent at the end of the season, and signed with the Texas Rangers. He batted clean-up, and started in right field at the 1978 All-Star Game at San Diego Stadium in San Diego. For the season, Zisk batted .262 with 22 home runs and 85 RBIs splitting time between left field, right field and designated hitter.

Seattle Mariners

After three seasons in Texas, Zisk was traded along with Jerry Don Gleaton, Rick Auerbach, Ken Clay, Brian Allard and minor-league right-handed pitcher Steve Finch from the Rangers to the Mariners for Willie Horton, Rick Honeycutt, Leon Roberts, Mario Mendoza and Larry Cox in an 11-player blockbuster deal on December 18, 1980. His first season in Seattle, he batted .311 with sixteen home runs to earn 1981 AL Comeback Player of the Year honors. After three seasons as the Mariners' designated hitter, he retired after the 1983 season.

Career stats

Personal life
Zisk was raised in Parsippany-Troy Hills, New Jersey, and played baseball at Parsippany High School. The Daytona Cubs retired Richie's number 22 on July 20, 2007, with his family in attendance and on his bobblehead day. His younger brother, John, played a season in the Texas Rangers' organization, and two for the independent Wausau Timbers of the Midwest League.

In 2004, Zisk was inducted into the National Polish-American Sports Hall of Fame.

During 2011 and 2012, Zisk was in charge of pro scouting in Florida for the Chicago Cubs.

See also

 List of Major League Baseball players to hit for the cycle

References

Further reading

External links

Richie Zisk at Baseball Almanac

1949 births
Living people
American League All-Stars
American people of Polish descent
Baseball players from New Jersey
Baseball players from New York (state)
Charleston Charlies players
Chicago Cubs scouts
Chicago White Sox players
Gastonia Pirates players
Major League Baseball left fielders
Major League Baseball right fielders
Parsippany High School alumni
People from Parsippany-Troy Hills, New Jersey
Pittsburgh Pirates players
Salem Rebels players
Seattle Mariners players
Sportspeople from Morris County, New Jersey
Texas Rangers players
Waterbury Pirates players